Consall is a civil parish in the district of Staffordshire Moorlands, Staffordshire, England. It contains eight listed buildings that are recorded in the National Heritage List for England. All the listed buildings are designated at Grade II, the lowest of the three grades, which is applied to "buildings of national importance and special interest".  The parish contains the village of Consall and the surrounding area, which is mainly rural.  The listed buildings consist of three farmhouses, a cottage, a barn, a lime kiln, and a milepost and a milestone, both on the Caldon Canal.


Buildings

References

Citations

Sources

Lists of listed buildings in Staffordshire